If I'm Honest is the tenth studio album by American country music singer Blake Shelton. It was released on May 20, 2016 via Warner Bros. Nashville. The album was produced by Shelton's longtime producer Scott Hendricks and features collaborations with Gwen Stefani and The Oak Ridge Boys.

Background
According to Shelton the album is very personal and addresses his high and lows of 2015.

One of the album's tracks, "Green", was previously included on Shelton's 2008 album Startin' Fires.

The album's tenth track "Friends", is the theme song to the 2016 film The Angry Birds Movie, which was released on the same day as the album. The song is also featured on its corresponding soundtrack.

Singles
"Came Here to Forget" is the album's first single, and it was released on March 8, 2016. The song debuted at number one on the Country Digital Chart and has sold 136,000 copies as of March 2016.

The second single from the album, "Savior's Shadow", was released on April 8, 2016. This song impacted Christian radio on April 11, 2016 in addition to the country format.

"She's Got a Way with Words" was released on June 6, 2016 as the album's third overall and second promotional single.

"A Guy with a Girl" became the album's fourth single on September 26, 2016.

"Every Time I Hear That Song" was released as the fifth and final single on February 20, 2017.

Critical reception

 If I'm Honest  was met with generally mixed reviews. At Metacritic, which assigns a normalized rating out of 100 to reviews from professional publications, the album received an average score of 58, based on 5 reviews, indicating "mixed or average reviews". 

Stephen Thomas Erlewine of  AllMusic wrote that the album "is at its core a balladeer's record," and that Shelton pulls off "these romance tunes with a sly, masculine grace that complements the album's sleek modern surfaces." Jim Farber of Entertainment Weekly stated that, "What's more: the album’s breezy Nashville-pop tunes never strike below the surface. Small wonder the toss-off songs seem more credible." Rolling Stones Keith Harris reported that "Shelton's warmly confident delivery makes those romantic twists and turns sound both lived in but universal".

Glenn Gamboa of Newsday opined that the bulk of the album "is a mix of letting old relationships go and starting new ones." In a review for the Los Angeles Times, Mikael Wood suggests in the home of country music, "the default setting is polished professionalism; rawness actually takes time. And here Shelton seldom pushes beyond that finesse to reach something less smooth." Erik Ernst, writing for Milwaukee Journal Sentinel, opines that "this disc's balance of modern verve, emotional introspection and country inflection is where Shelton is supposed to be." In its review for  Consequence of Sound, Janine Schaults commented that "The Country pop star's post-breakup album flounders under too many glitzy, cheesy pop flourishes." Chuck Campbell from the Knoxville News Sentinel said that "Blake Shelton sounds more like a savvy marketer than any kind of artist".

Commercial performance
The album debuted at No. 3 on U.S. Billboard 200 chart, selling 153,000 copies (170,000 album equivalent units) during its first week. It also debuted at No. 1 the Top Country Albums chart. The album was certified Gold by the RIAA on August 23, 2016. It became the eleventh best-selling album of 2016 in the United States with over 522,000 copies sold that year.  As of November 2017, the album has sold 627,300 copies in the U.S.

Track listing

Personnel
Credits adapted from the liner notes of the standard edition of If I'm Honest.

Blake Shelton – lead vocals
Roy Agee – trombone
Duane Allen – background vocals
Hari Bernstein – viola
Jessica Blackwell – violin
Joe Bonsall – background vocals
Tom Bukovac – electric guitar
Perry Coleman – background vocals
Paul DiGiovanni – programming
Charles Dixon – cello
Paul Franklin – pedal steel guitar
William Lee Golden – background vocals
Aubrey Haynie – fiddle, mandolin
Steve Herrmann – trumpet
Wes Hightower – background vocals

Jim Horn – saxophone
Charlie Judge – string arrangements, synthesizer
Troy Lancaster – electric guitar
Tony Lucido – bass guitar
Gordon Mote – Hammond B-3 organ, keyboards, piano
Emily Nelson – cello
Russ Pahl – pedal steel guitar
Jimmie Lee Sloas – bass guitar
Gwen Stefani – guest vocals
Richard Sterban – background vocals
Bryan Sutton – acoustic guitar
Ilya Toshinsky – acoustic guitar
Derek Wells – acoustic guitar, electro-acoustic guitar
Nir Z. – drums, percussion, programming

Charts

Weekly charts

Year-end charts

Certifications

Release history

References

2016 albums
Blake Shelton albums
Warner Records albums
Albums produced by Scott Hendricks